The dental ejective fricative is a rare type of consonantal sound, used in some spoken languages.

Features
Features of the alveolar ejective fricative:

Occurrence
 occurs in Modern South Arabian languages and is also reconstructed for the hypothetical Proto-Semitic language.

See also
 Index of phonetics articles

References

External links
 

Dental consonants
Fricative consonants
Ejectives
Oral consonants
Central consonants